Serpentine-de-Coleraine Ecological Reserve is an ecological reserve in Quebec, Canada. It was established on

References

External links
 Official website from Government of Québec

Protected areas of Chaudière-Appalaches
Nature reserves in Quebec
Protected areas established in 2003
2003 establishments in Quebec